Yongsan-dong is a ward of Yongsan-gu in Seoul, South Korea.

Attractions

 National Museum of Korea
 War Memorial of Korea

Government and infrastructure
The ward has the headquarters of the Ministry of National Defense.

Education
Schools located in Yongsan-dong:
 Seoul Yongam Elementary School
 Bosung Girls' Middle School
 Yongsan Middle School
 Bosung Girls' High School
 Yongsan High School

References

External links
 Yongsan official homepage 

Neighbourhoods of Yongsan District